Check No. 130 is a 1915 American short silent drama film, directed by Jack Harvey. It stars Boyd Marshall, Muriel Ostriche, and Morgan Jones.

References

External links
Check No. 130 at the Internet Movie Database

1915 films
American silent short films
American black-and-white films
Silent American drama films
1915 drama films
Films directed by Jack Harvey
Thanhouser Company films
1915 short films
1910s American films